Tát is a town in Komárom-Esztergom County, Hungary.

Twin cities 

  Buseck, Germany
  Molln, Austria
  Obid, Slovakia
  Căpleni, Romania

References

External links

  in Hungarian
 Street map (Hungarian)

Populated places in Komárom-Esztergom County
Hungarian German communities